Martin Yanakiev (born 8 March 1983) is a Bulgarian rower. He competed in the men's double sculls event at the 2008 Summer Olympics.

References

External links
 

1983 births
Living people
Bulgarian male rowers
Olympic rowers of Bulgaria
Rowers at the 2008 Summer Olympics
Sportspeople from Burgas